Anthony G. "Cholly Rock" Horne (born May 24, 1960), is a first generation B-Boy and one of the original 11 members (known collectively as the "First 11") of the "Zulu Kings" – the predecessor and genesis of The Universal Zulu Nation. Born and raised in The Gun Hill Houses in the Williamsbridge section of The Bronx, New York, he was introduced to B-Boying (in its original style of "Burning") in 1974 and during this time began going to parties given by the "Father of Hip Hop", DJ Kool Herc, where he first saw such BBoys as Clark Kent, The "Smith Twins" and James Bond, modernize the art form at venues such as The Hevalo, The Executive Playhouse and Webster PAL in the Bronx.

It was in the Bronx River Houses in the Soundview section of The Bronx that he made his name and reputation as an "A1 BBoy", being made a member of the Zulu Kings by Afrika Bambaataa in 1976, the first Zulu King from the Northeast Bronx.

He has been a practitioner of several elements of the hip hop culture including being an early member of Soulsonic Force MCs with the DJ Afrika Bambaataa.

As an adult, he has pursued his professional career in the field of public health and education as a teacher in the New York City school system, a facilitator and health educator for the New York State Department of Health, and a trainer for The Center for Disease Control and Prevention.

Discography

References

Joseph C. Ewoodzie. JrBreak Beats in the Bronx: Rediscovering Hip-Hop's Early Years. The University of the North Carolina Press, 2017 
"Cash Money" - General Music Inc. 1981 Cholly Rock discography at Discogs [a251419]
Steven Hager, "Afrika Bambaataa's Hip-Hop", The Village Voice, 1981
The Universal Zulu Nation
The Universal Hip Hop Museum - Secretary for the B-boy Committee

 

1960 births
Living people